Quiet Killing is a Canadian documentary film, directed by Kim O'Bomsawin and released in 2018. An examination of the issue of missing and murdered Indigenous women, the film explores the reasons why indigenous women are uniquely vulnerable to violence by juxtaposing the stories of some missing or murdered women with the personal testimonies of women who are doing activism on the issue and women who have personally survived incidents of violence.

The film's original French version premiered theatrically at the Rendez-vous Québec Cinéma in 2018, and the film was broadcast as an episode of APTN's television documentary series Perspectives APTN in both English and French versions.

The film won the Donald Brittain Award for Best Social or Political Documentary Program at the 7th Canadian Screen Awards.

References

2018 films
2018 documentary films
Documentary films about First Nations
Quebec films
Donald Brittain Award winning shows
Documentary films about violence against women
Missing and Murdered Indigenous Women and Girls movement
Documentary films about crime in Canada
2010s French-language films
French-language Canadian films
2010s Canadian films